Dale Lee Iniff (born 18 September 1977) is a former English cricketer.  Iniff was a left-handed batsman who bowled right-arm medium pace.  He was born at Penrith, Cumbria.

Iniff represented the Northamptonshire Cricket Board in a single List A match against Wiltshire in the 1999 NatWest Trophy.  In his only List A match, he took a single wicket at a cost of 37 runs.

References

External links
Dale Iniff at Cricinfo
Dale Iniff at CricketArchive

1977 births
Living people
People from Penrith, Cumbria
English cricketers
Northamptonshire Cricket Board cricketers
Cricketers from Cumbria